John Campbell (born 6 February 1949) is a New Zealand long-distance runner. He competed in the men's marathon at the 1988 Summer Olympics.

He set the Masters record when at the age of 41, he ran 2:11:04 at the 1990 Boston Marathon, breaking the previous Masters record by 15 seconds set by Jack Foster at the 1974 British Commonwealth Games.

References

External links
 

1949 births
Living people
Athletes (track and field) at the 1988 Summer Olympics
New Zealand male long-distance runners
New Zealand male marathon runners
Olympic athletes of New Zealand
Athletes from Dunedin